Bennet Bicknell (November 14, 1781 – September 15, 1841) was an American War of 1812 veteran and politician who served one term as a U.S. Representative from New York from 1837 to 1839.

Biography
Born in Mansfield, Connecticut, Bicknell attended the public schools. He married Lucinda Crane and they had four children, Harrison, Julia, Harriet, and James.

Career
Bicknell moved to Morrisville, New York, in 1808, and served in the War of 1812.

Political career 
He served as member of the New York State Assembly in 1812 and served in the New York State Senate from 1814 to 1818. He served as clerk of Madison County, New York from 1821 to 1825, and was editor of the Madison Observer.

Congress 
Elected as a Democrat to the Twenty-fifth Congress, Bicknell was United States Representative for the twenty-third district of New York from March 4, 1837 to March 3, 1839.  He was an unsuccessful candidate for reelection in 1838 to the Twenty-sixth Congress.

Death
Bicknell died in Morrisville, Madison County, New York, on September 15, 1841 (age 59 years, 305 days). He is interred at Morrisville Rural Cemetery.

References

External links

1781 births
1841 deaths
Democratic Party members of the New York State Assembly
Democratic Party New York (state) state senators
American military personnel of the War of 1812
19th-century American newspaper editors
People from Mansfield, Connecticut
People from Morrisville, New York
Democratic Party members of the United States House of Representatives from New York (state)
19th-century American politicians